Crispin "Cris" Cole is a British writer and producer.

Career
Born in Wallingford, England, he grew up in London and attended Elliott School in Roehampton. After leaving the Elliott School, Cole worked as a professional guitarist and bass player for the next 15 years, playing in bands including Jimmy the Hoover, The Directions and The Hollywood Killers.

Cole turned to writing and wrote a pilot for Tiger Aspect/BBC, called Embassy, starring Robert Daws. Cole has multiple other TV credits, including episodes of Night and Day, Twisted Tales and The Bill, feature film credits, including Lovebite (Ecosse Films, 2012) and Pelican Blood (Ecosse Films, 2010), as well as the TV movie The Good Times Are Killing Me (Shaftersbury Films, 2009). He also wrote and executive produced the movie Ana (2020 film), released in January 2020, starring Andy Garcia and Dafne Keen.

Cole may be best known as the creator of the award-winning and the BAFTA nominated British TV series Mad Dogs, starring Marc Warren, Max Beesley, John Simm and Phil Glenister. He was the sole writer of all 14 episodes for the four UK seasons for Sky TV, produced by Left Bank Pictures.

Cole was the executive producer and showrunner on the Mad Dogs U.S. television series made by Amazon Studios/Sony Pictures Television. The show was streamed on Amazon in the US, Germany and the UK. Sony sold Mad Dogs to 140 other territories. The series starred Ben Chaplin, Michael Imperioli, Romany Malco, Steve Zahn and Billy Zane.

Cole has been an advocate of Ethiopian choreographer Meseret Yirga for over 20 years. In 2019 he headed up a fundraising campaign to build a community dance centre in Addis Ababa. Once the money was in place, the Meseret Yirga Dance Centre was built, is now open, and serves people from low income backgrounds and the disabled in the community.

Personal life
Cris Cole is the son of the actor George Cole and former film actress Eileen Moore.

Filmography
 Embassy (1997)
 Night & Day (2001)  
 Spine Chillers (2003)  
 The Bill, 2 episodes (2004–2005) 
 Twisted Tales, 1 episode (2005)  
 The Good Times Are Killing Me (2009)
 Pelican Blood (2010]) 
 Mad Dogs (UK) (2011–2013)  
 Love Bite (2012) 
 Mad Dogs (U.S.) (2016)
  Ana (2020)

References

External links

Year of birth missing (living people)
Living people
British television writers
British male screenwriters
British rock guitarists
British male guitarists
People from Wallingford, Oxfordshire
British male television writers